Markov's principle, named after Andrey Markov Jr, is a conditional existence statement for which there are many equivalent formulations, as discussed below.

The principle is logically valid classically, but not in  intuitionistic constructive mathematics. However, many particular instances of it are nevertheless provable in a constructive context as well.

History 
The principle was first studied and adopted by the Russian school of constructivism, together with  choice principles and often with a realizability perspective on the notion of mathematical function.

In computability theory
In the language of computability theory, Markov's principle is a formal expression of the claim that if it is impossible that an algorithm does not terminate, then for some input it does terminate. This is equivalent to the claim that if a set and its complement are both computably enumerable, then the set is decidable.

In intuitionistic logic
In predicate logic, a predicate P over some domain is called decidable if for every x in the domain, either P(x) is true, or P(x) is not true. This is not trivially true constructively. 

For a decidable predicate P over the natural numbers, Markov's principle then reads:

That is, if P cannot be false for all natural numbers n, then it is true for some n.

Markov's rule
Markov's rule is the formulation of Markov's principle as a rule. Formally,

Anne Troelstra proved that it is an admissible rule in Heyting arithmetic. Later, the logician Harvey Friedman showed that Markov's rule is an admissible rule in all of intuitionistic logic, Heyting arithmetic, and various other intuitionistic theories, using the Friedman translation.

In Heyting arithmetic
Markov's principle is equivalent in the language of arithmetic to:

for  a total recursive function on the natural numbers.

Realizability
If constructive arithmetic is translated using realizability into a classical meta-theory that proves the -consistency of the relevant classical theory (for example, Peano Arithmetic if we are studying Heyting arithmetic), then Markov's principle is justified: a realizer is the constant function that takes a realization that  is not everywhere false to the unbounded search that successively checks if  is true. If  is not everywhere false, then by -consistency there must be a term for which  holds, and each term will be checked by the search eventually. If however  does not hold anywhere, then the domain of the constant function must be empty, so although the search does not halt it still holds vacuously that the function is a realizer. By the Law of the Excluded Middle (in our classical metatheory),  must either hold nowhere or not hold nowhere, therefore this constant function is a realizer.

If instead the realizability interpretation is used in a constructive meta-theory, then it is not justified. Indeed, for first-order arithmetic, Markov's principle exactly captures the difference between a constructive and classical meta-theory. Specifically, a statement is provable in Heyting arithmetic with Extended Church's thesis if and only if there is a number that provably realizes it in Heyting arithmetic; and it is provable in Heyting arithmetic with Extended Church's thesis and Markov's principle if and only if there is a number that provably realizes it in Peano arithmetic.

In constructive analysis
Markov's principle is equivalent, in the language of real analysis, to the following principles:

 For each real number x, if it is contradictory that x is equal to 0, then there exists y ∈ Q such that 0 < y < |x|, often expressed by saying that x is apart from, or constructively unequal to, 0.
 For each real number x, if it is contradictory that x is equal to 0, then there exists y ∈ R such that xy = 1.

Modified realizability does not justify Markov's principle, even if classical logic is used in the meta-theory: there is no realizer in the language of simply typed lambda calculus as this language is not Turing-complete and arbitrary loops cannot be defined in it.

Weak Markov's principle
Weak Markov's principle is a weaker form of Markov's principle that may be stated in the language of analysis as

It is a conditional statement about the decidability of positivity of a real number.

This form can be justified by Brouwer's continuity principles, whereas the stronger form contradicts them. Thus it can be derived from intuitionistic, realizability, and classical reasoning, in each case for different reasons, but this principle is not valid in the general constructive sense of Bishop.

See also 
 Constructive analysis
 Church's thesis (constructive mathematics)
 Limited principle of omniscience

References

External links 
 Constructive Mathematics (Stanford Encyclopedia of Philosophy)

Logic
Constructivism (mathematics)
Mathematical principles